Government Arts College for Men, Nandanam, is a general degree college located at Nandanam, Chennai, Tamil Nadu. It was established in the year 1969. The college is affiliated with University of Madras. This college offers different courses in arts, commerce and science.

Department

Science

Physics
Chemistry
Mathematics
Computer Application
Botany
Zoology

Arts and Commerce

Urdu
English literature
History
Economics
Commerce
Tamil literature
administraction

Accreditation
The college is  recognized by the University Grants Commission (UGC).

References

External links
http://www.gacnandanam.com/

Educational institutions established in 1969
1969 establishments in Tamil Nadu
Colleges affiliated to University of Madras
Universities and colleges in Chennai

This college are mainly for visually changelled students